The 1935 Temiskamingue earthquake occurred on November 1 with a moment magnitude of 6.1 and a maximum Mercalli intensity of VII (Very strong). The event took place in the Western Quebec Seismic Zone in the Abitibi-Témiscamingue region of Quebec.

Earthquake 
The earthquake was a result of movement on a moderately dipping thrust fault, interpreted to represent reactivation of one of the extensional faults associated with the Timiskaming Graben. It occurred at 1:03 a.m. Occasional aftershocks were reported for several months.

Damage 
Researcher E. A. Hodgson later concluded that the embankment slide was already imminent, and was merely hastened by the vibrations. Some rockfalls and structural cracks were also reported, although there were few major structural collapses aside from the Parent embankment. The relative lack of major damage, despite the fact that it was a strong earthquake, has been attributed primarily to the sparseness of the area's population.

Other events 
The 2000 Kipawa earthquake on January 1, with a magnitude of 5.2, had its epicentre at Lake Kipawa, very near the epicentre of the 1935 quake.

See also
 List of earthquakes in 1935
 List of earthquakes in Canada

References 

Sources

External links
The M6.2 1935 Temiskamingue earthquake – Natural Resources Canada
The Western Quebec Seismic Zone – Natural Resources Canada

1935 Timiskaming
1935 Timiskaming
1935 earthquakes
1935 in Canada
1935 in Quebec
1935 in Ontario
1935 disasters in Canada